Carman Junction is a railway junction in the Canadian province of Manitoba to the west of Winnipeg. It is a link between Canadian National Railway's Rivers subdivision and the Central Manitoba Railway.

Scotland
A geocaching point with the same name, possibly named after a railway junction, exists in southern Scotland near N 55° 58.716 W 004° 37.009  or British Grid: NS 36822 79264. https://www.geocaching.com/geocache/GC4TE0D_carman-junction

References

External links
Red Board of Carman Junction

Railway stations in Manitoba